The Baxter County Courthouse is a courthouse in Mountain Home, Arkansas, United States, the county seat of Baxter County, built in 1941. It was listed on the National Register of Historic Places in 1995. The building replaced another courthouse on the same site which was deemed unsafe in 1939.

History

Baxter County was established on March 24, 1873 by the Arkansas General Assembly from parts of four neighboring counties. The county seat was established at Mountain Home, which was a community atop a plateau between the North Fork River and White River. County government initially inhabited the Jacob Wolf House in Norfork. Today, the structure is the oldest standing county courthouse in Arkansas, built in 1811.

Building the courthouse
County Judge R. M. Ruthven declared the county courthouse to be unsafe and too small for county needs in 1939. Ruthven was instrumental in the construction of the Cotter Bridge in Baxter County which opened the area to commerce in 1928. The courthouse was expanded from two to three stories as a method to keep the county seat in Mountain Home in response to a 1912 state law which kept county seats from moving out of three story buildings. Ruthven acquired the services of T. Ewing Shelton, an architect from Fayetteville, Arkansas to draft plans for a new courthouse. The plans were received and approved by voters, despite protests by Gassville and Cotter residents who wanted the county seat relocated to their cities with greater populations.

During the 1940s, Baxter County was very depressed economically and the Works Progress Administration (WPA) was active in the county. Mountain Home was a shrinking community with little industry and few paved roads. As a county, Baxter County saw many farmers abandon their farms and move away during the 1940s. Construction began on the Norfork Dam in 1941 and the Bull Shoals Dam in 1947. The courthouse project received state approval as a WPA project the following year and construction began after razing the old courthouse in August 1941.

Opening
The new building was unveiled for county courthouse functions in August 1943. It contained all county offices, a courtroom, office space to be rented to lawyers, and the county library. Today many offices have left the courthouse.

See also
 
 
 Cotter Bridge
 List of county courthouses in Arkansas
 National Register of Historic Places listings in Baxter County, Arkansas

References

Courthouses on the National Register of Historic Places in Arkansas
County courthouses in Arkansas
Government buildings completed in 1941
Streamline Moderne architecture in the United States
National Register of Historic Places in Baxter County, Arkansas
Historic district contributing properties in Arkansas
Mountain Home, Arkansas
1941 establishments in Arkansas